Tell es-Sultan (lit. Sultan's Hill), also known as Tel Jericho or Ancient Jericho, is a UNESCO-nominated archaeological site in the West Bank, in the State of Palestine, located adjacent to the Ein as-Sultan refugee camp two kilometres north of the centre of Jericho. The tell was inhabited from the 10th millennium BCE, and has been called "the oldest town in the world", with many significant archaeological finds; the site is also notable for its role in the history of Levantine archaeology.

The area was first identified as the site of ancient Jericho in modern times by Charles Warren in 1868, on the basis of its proximity to the large spring of Ein es-Sultan that had been proposed as the spring of Elisha by Edward Robinson three decades earlier.

History

Natufian hunter-gatherers,  10,000 BCE 
The first permanent settlement on the site developed between 10,000 and 9000 BCE. During the Younger Dryas period of cold and drought, permanent habitation of any one location was impossible. However, Tell es-Sultan was a popular camping ground for Natufian hunter-gatherer groups due to the nearby Ein as-Sultan spring; these hunter-gatherers left a scattering of crescent-shaped microlith tools behind them. Around 9600 BCE the droughts and cold of the Younger Dryas stadial came to an end, making it possible for Natufian groups to extend the duration of their stay, eventually leading to year-round habitation and permanent settlement. Epipaleolithic construction at the site appears to predate the invention of agriculture, with the construction of Natufian structures beginning earlier than 9000 BC, the very beginning of the Holocene epoch in geologic history.

Pre-Pottery Neolithic,  8500 BCE

Pre-Pottery Neolithic A (PPNA) 
The Pre-Pottery Neolithic A phase at Tell es-Sultan (ca. 8500 – 7500 BCE) saw the emergence of one of the world's first major proto-cities. As the world warmed up, a new culture based on agriculture and sedentary dwelling emerged, which archaeologists have termed "Pre-Pottery Neolithic A" (abbreviated as PPNA), sometimes called the Sultanian era after the town. PPNA villages are characterized by small circular dwellings, burial of the dead under the floor of buildings, reliance on hunting wild game, the cultivation of wild or domestic cereals, and no use of pottery yet.

Circular dwellings were built of clay and straw bricks left to dry in the sun, which were plastered together with a mud mortar. Hearths were located within and outside the homes.

The identity and number of the inhabitants of Jericho during the PPNA period is still under debate, with estimates going as high as 2000–3000, and as low as 200–300. It is known that this population had cultivated emmer wheat, barley and pulses and hunted wild animals.

This tower was the tallest structure in the world until the Pyramid of Djoser, and the second-oldest tower after the one at Tell Qaramel. The wall and tower were built around 8000 BCE. For the tower carbon dates published in 1981 and 1983 indicate that it was built around 8300 BCE and stayed in use until ca. 7800 BC. The wall and tower would have taken a hundred men more than a hundred days to construct, thus suggesting some kind of social organization and division of labour.

The major structures highlight the importance of the Tell for the understanding of settlement patterns in the Sultanian period in the southern Levant.

Pre-Pottery Neolithic B (PPNB) 
After a few centuries, the first settlement was abandoned. After the PPNA settlement phase there was a settlement hiatus of several centuries, then the Pre-Pottery Neolithic B settlement was founded on the eroded surface of the tell. This second settlement, established in 6800 BCE, perhaps represents the work of an invading people who absorbed the original inhabitants into their dominant culture. Artifacts dating from this period include ten plastered human skulls, painted so as to reconstitute the individuals' features. These represent either teraphim or an early example of portraiture in art history, and it is thought that they were kept in people's homes while the bodies were buried.

The architecture consisted of rectilinear buildings made of mudbricks on stone foundations. The mudbricks were loaf-shaped with deep thumb prints to facilitate bounding. No building has been excavated in its entirety. Normally, several rooms cluster around a central courtyard. There is one big room and a second slightly smaller room containing internal divisions. The remaining areas are small, and presumably used for storage. The rooms have red or pinkish terrazzo-floors made of lime. Some impressions of mats made of reeds or rushes have been preserved. The courtyards have clay floors.

Kathleen Kenyon interpreted one building as a shrine. It contained a niche in the wall. A chipped pillar of volcanic stone that was found nearby might have fit into this niche.

The dead were buried under the floors or in the rubble fill of abandoned buildings. There are several collective burials. Not all the skeletons are completely articulated, which may point to a time of exposure before burial. A skull cache contained seven skulls. The jaws were removed and the faces covered with plaster; cowries were used as eyes. A total of ten skulls were found. Modelled skulls were found in Tell Ramad and Beisamoun as well.

Other finds included flints, such as arrowheads (tanged or side-notched), finely denticulated sickle-blades, burins, scrapers, a few tranchet axes, obsidian, and green obsidian from an unknown source. There were also querns, hammerstones, and a few ground-stone axes made of greenstone. Other items discovered included dishes and bowls carved from soft limestone, spindle whorls made of stone and possible loom weights, spatulae and drills, stylised anthropomorphic plaster figures, almost life-size, anthropomorphic and theriomorphic clay figurines, as well as shell and malachite beads.

Bronze Age 
A succession of settlements followed from 4500 BCE onward, the largest constructed in 2600 BCE.

Tell es-Sultan was continually occupied into the Middle Bronze Age; it was destroyed in the Late Bronze, after which it no longer served as an urban centre. The city was surrounded by extensive defensive walls strengthened with rectangular towers, and possessed an extensive cemetery with vertical shaft-tombs and underground burial chambers; the elaborate funeral offerings in some of these may reflect the emergence of local kings.

During the Middle Bronze Age Tell es-Sultan was a small prominent city of the Canaan region, reaching its greatest Bronze Age extent in the period from 1700 to 1550 BCE. It seems to have reflected the greater urbanization in the area at that time, and has been linked to the rise of the Maryannu, a class of chariot-using aristocrats linked to the rise of the Mitannite state to the north. Kathleen Kenyon reported "...the Middle Bronze Age is perhaps the most prosperous in the whole history of Kna'an. ... The defenses ... belong to a fairly advanced date in that period" and there was "a massive stone revetment... part of a complex system" of defenses (pp. 213–218). The Bronze-Age city fell in the 16th century at the end of the Middle Bronze Age, the calibrated carbon remains from its City-IV destruction layer dating to 1617–1530 BCE. Notably this carbon dating  1573 BCE confirmed the accuracy of the stratigraphical dating  1550 by Kenyon.

Iron Age 
Tell es-Sultan remained unoccupied from the end of the 15th to the 10th-9th centuries BCE, when the city was rebuilt. Of this new city not much more remains than a four-room house on the eastern slope. By the 7th century Jericho had become an extensive town, but this settlement was destroyed in the Babylonian conquest of Judah in the early 6th century.

Abandonment of the tell 
After the destruction of the Judahite city by the Babylonians in the late 6th century, whatever was rebuilt in the Persian period as part of the Restoration after the Babylonian captivity, left only very few remains. The tell was abandoned as a place of settlement not long after this period.

Archaeological excavation 

The first excavations of the tells around Ain es Sultan were made by Charles Warren in 1868 on behalf of the Palestine Exploration Fund. Warren excavated nine mounds in the area of the spring; during one of the excavations his workmen dug through the mud bricks of the wall without realizing what it was.

The spring had been identified in 1838 in Edward Robinson's Biblical Researches in Palestine as "the scene of Elisha's miracle", on the basis of it being the primary spring near to Jericho. On this basis Warren proposed the surrounding mounds as the site of Ancient Jericho, however, Warren did not have the funds to carry out a full excavation. Believing that it was clearly the spring where Elisha healed, he suggested shifting the entire mound for evidence, which he thought could be done for £400.

Ernst Sellin and Carl Watzinger excavated Tell es-Sultan and Tulul Abu el-'Alayiq between 1907–1909 and in 1911, finding the remains of two walls which they initially suggested supported the biblical account of the Battle of Jericho. They later revised this conclusion and dated their finds to the Middle Bronze Age (1950-1550 BC).

The site was again excavated by John Garstang between 1930 and 1936, who again raised the suggestion that remains of the upper wall was that described in the Bible, and dated to around 1400 BCE.

Extensive investigations using more modern techniques were made by Kathleen Kenyon between 1952 and 1958. Her excavations discovered a tower and wall in trench I. Kenyon provided evidence that both constructions dated much earlier than previous estimates of the site's age, to the Neolithic, and were part of an early proto-city. Her excavations found a series of seventeen early Bronze Age walls, some of which she thought may have been destroyed by earthquakes. The last of the walls was put together in a hurry, indicating that the settlement had been destroyed by nomadic invaders. Another wall was built by a more sophisticated culture in the Middle Bronze Age with a steep plastered escarpment leading up to mud bricks on top.

Lorenzo Nigro and Nicolo Marchetti conducted excavations in 1997–2000. Since 2009 the Italian-Palestinian archaeological project of excavation and restoration was resumed by Rome "La Sapienza" University and Palestinian MOTA-DACH under the direction of Lorenzo Nigro and Hamdan Taha.

Renewed excavations were carried out at Tell es-Sultan from 2009 to 2023 by the Italian-Palestinian Expedition directed by Lorenzo Nigro for Sapienza University of Rome and Jehad Yasine for the Ministry of Tourism & Antiquities of Palestine. These works uncovered several monuments of the Bronze Age City: the Palaces on the Spring Hill (Early Bronze II-III, 3000-2350 BC; MB I-II, called "Palace of the Shepherds Kings" and the MB III palace, called "Hyksos' Palace"), the south-east Gate, called Jerusalem Gate, and several traits of the ancient city-walls (www.lasapienzatojericho.it).

Walls 
It is suggested to date to approximately 8000 BC. If interpreted as an "urban fortification", the Wall of Jericho is the oldest city wall discovered by archaeologists anywhere in the world. Kenyon commented that the "labour involved in excavating this ditch out of solid rock must have been tremendous."

Tower of Jericho 

The Tower of Jericho is an  stone structure, built in the Pre-Pottery Neolithic A period around 8000 BCE. It is among the earliest stone monuments of mankind. It contains an internal staircase with 22 stone steps. The construction of the tower is estimated to have taken 11,000 working days.

Comparative chronology

External links

References

Bibliography 

10th millennium BC
1868 archaeological discoveries
Jericho
Bronze Age sites in the State of Palestine
Hebrew Bible cities
Natufian sites
Neolithic
Neolithic settlements
Prehistoric art
Tegart forts
Torah cities
Destroyed cities
Canaanite cities
Archaeological type sites
Tells (archaeology)
Historic Jewish communities
Pre-Pottery Neolithic B
Pre-Pottery Neolithic A